The Three Sisters are a trio of lakes connected by short creeks in Nipissing District, Ontario, Canada, about  north of the village of Temagami. This group of lakes is situated in the geographic Best Township, which makes up part of the Municipality of Temagami.

Hydrology
Three unnamed creeks flow into the North Sister at its northern end; the South Sister also has two unnamed creek inflows, one at its northern tip and another at its southeastern tip. The primary outflow is an unnamed creek, from the south end of the South Sister, to Thieving Bear Lake, which eventually flows via an unnamed creek, Net Lake, Net Creek, Cassels Lake, Rabbit Lake, the Matabitchuan River, Lake Timiskaming and the Ottawa River into the Saint Lawrence River.

See also
Lakes of Temagami

References

Lakes of Temagami